Leptodactylus pustulatus is a species of frog in the family Leptodactylidae. It is endemic to Brazil. Its natural habitats are moist savanna, subtropical or tropical moist shrubland, freshwater marshes, pastureland, rural gardens, urban areas, and ponds. The female frog seems to provide some level of parental care for the tadpoles. This is a common species of frog and the International Union for Conservation of Nature has listed it as being of "least concern".

Description
It can easily be distinguished from other members of its genus by its distinctive ventral colouration which consists of large, red to yellow spots on a dark-coloured background. Its calls, which are heard at night, are also distinctive; the male's advertisement call consists of two notes, repeated at a rate of about twenty-six calls per minute and other males respond to these in a similarly characteristic fashion.

Distribution and habitat
L. pustulatus is endemic to Brazil where it is found in the Cerrado, a tropical savannah area, in the states of Goiás, Mato Grosso, Tocantins, Ceará and Maranhão. It is usually found in the vicinity of water bodies, and is an adaptable species, able to tolerate disturbed areas including gardens and urban locations. Much of its habitat consists of seasonally flooded areas in the Araguaia, Tocantins, Xingu and Parnaíba river systems.

Biology
Breeding takes place around October in flooded grassland and flooded gallery forest habitats. Males call from still-water sites such as at the edges of ponds, often from near aquatic vegetation or fallen trees. Cattle dams are also used as breeding sites. Tadpoles have been found in large accumulations, sometimes swimming around a female floating in the water. On several occasions, a female was observed to "gather" tadpoles around her and move the group to a new location; the adult seems to have been providing some level of parental care. Both tadpoles and adults are at risk from predators such as wolf fish (Hoplias spp.) and the brown-banded water snake (Helicops angulatus).

Status
L. pustulatus is a common species; it has a wide range and large total population which is believed to be stable, and no particular threats have been identified. The International Union for Conservation of Nature has assessed its conservation status as being of "least concern".

References

pustulatus
Endemic fauna of Brazil
Amphibians described in 1870
Taxa named by Wilhelm Peters
Taxonomy articles created by Polbot